William Williams (12 February 1788 – 26 April 1865), was a Welsh Radical politician.

Born in Llanpumsaint, Carmarthenshire, and having had only a basic education, Williams began working in a cotton warehouse in London and soon built up his own business. In 1833 he became a member of the Common Council of the City of London, and in 1835 was elected MP for Coventry.  After losing the seat in 1847, he became MP for Lambeth in 1850.

As a result of a speech made by Williams on 10 March 1846, a government inquiry into the state of education in Wales was launched, culminating in the 1847 Reports of the Commissioners of Inquiry into the State of Education in Wales. In 1863 he chaired the meeting that launched the campaign for a University of Wales.

William Williams was a generous benefactor to the village of his birth, paying for the construction and furnishing of the village school in 1862.

William Williams died on 26 April 1865, after falling from his horse in Hyde Park, London. He is buried in Kensal Green Cemetery, London, in a grave north-east of the main chapel, alongside his parliamentary friend Joseph Hume. A plaque is dedicated to him in the village school he founded in Llanpumsaint.

References

External links 
 

1788 births
1865 deaths
Burials at Kensal Green Cemetery
Welsh politicians
People from Carmarthenshire
Members of the Parliament of the United Kingdom for English constituencies
UK MPs 1835–1837
UK MPs 1837–1841
UK MPs 1841–1847
UK MPs 1847–1852
UK MPs 1852–1857
UK MPs 1857–1859
UK MPs 1859–1865
Members of Parliament for Coventry